Parjang (Sl. No.: 58) is a Vidhan Sabha constituency of Dhenkanal district, Odisha.

Area of this constituency includes Parjang block, Kankadahada block and 5 GPs (Kusumajodi, Kantapal, Tumusinga, Kantiokateni and Kantioputasahi) of Kamakshyanagar block.

In 2009 election, Biju Janata Dal candidate Dr. Nrusingha Sahu defeated BJP candidate Bibhuti Bhusan Pradhan by a margin of 5,188 votes.

Elected Members

Two elections were held during 2009 and 2014 in Parjanga constituency. The elected member is:
2014: (58): Nrusingha Charan Sahu (BJD)
2009: (58): Nrusingha Charan Sahu (BJD)

2019 Election Result

2014 Election Result
In 2014 election, Biju Janata Dal candidate Nrusingha Charan Sahu defeated Bharatiya Janata Party candidate Bibhuti Pradhan by a margin of 3,052 votes.

Summary of results of the 2009 Election

Notes

References

Assembly constituencies of Odisha
Dhenkanal district